Wheeler Creek is a stream in southeast DeKalb County in the U.S. state of Missouri. It is a tributary of Grindstone Creek.

The stream headwaters arise at  approximately 1.5 miles north of Osborn. The confluence is adjacent to Missouri Route C 3.5 miles northwest of Cameron.

Wheeler Creek, historically known as "Wheeler Branch", most likely was named after G. F. Wheeler, an early settler.

See also
List of rivers of Missouri

References

Rivers of DeKalb County, Missouri
Rivers of Missouri